The Crew of the Dora is a 1943 German film about Luftwaffe pilots.  It depicts a love triangle involving two of them being overcome by their participation in battle together.

The film was banned in 1944, because of the worsening war situation; while on leave one character inspires a girl with hopes of settling in the east, a dream that no longer appeared possible.

Cast
Hannes Stelzer as Flugzeugführer Leutnant Joachim Krane
Hubert Kiurina as Leutnant Franz von Borcke
Josef Dahmen as Feldwebel Otto Roggenkamp
Georg Thomalla as Bordschütze Unteroffizier Fritz Mott
Ernst von Klipstein as Hauptmann Kurt Gillhausen
Clemens Hasse as Oberleutnant Erich Krumbhaar
Helmut Schabrich as Oberleutnant Semmler
Wolfgang Preiss as Staffelarzt Dr. Wagner
Suse Graf as Dr. Marianne Güldener
Charlott Daudert as Mathilde Kronschnabel
Carsta Löck as Straßenbahnschaffnerin Betty Schütte
Roma Bahn as Laborantin Fräulein Bornschlegel
Otz Tollen as Oberleutnant
Ewald Wenck as Ober im Restaurant

Notes

References

External links

Further reading 

1940s German-language films
1943 films
Films of Nazi Germany
Nazi propaganda films
World War II aviation films
World War II films made in wartime
Films directed by Karl Ritter
German black-and-white films
German war drama films
1940s war drama films
1943 drama films
1940s German films
1930s German films